Year 321 (CCCXXI) was a common year starting on Sunday (link will display the full calendar) of the Julian calendar. In the Roman Empire, it was known as the Year of the Consulship of Crispus and Constantinus (or, less frequently, year 1074 Ab urbe condita). The denomination 321 for this year has been used since the early medieval period, when the Anno Domini calendar era became the prevalent method in Europe for naming years.

Events 
 By topic 

 Roman Empire 
 Emperor Constantine I expels the Goths from the Danube frontier and repairs Trajan's Bridge. He leads an expedition into the old province Dacia (modern Romania) and makes peace with the barbarians.
 March 7 - Constantine I signs legislation directing urban residents to refrain from work, and businesses to be closed, on the "venerable day of the Sun". An exception is made for agriculture.

 Asia 
 Tuoba Heru launches a coup d'état against his cousin Tuoba Yulü, and becomes the new Prince of Dai.

 By topic 

 Art and Science 
 Calcidius translates Plato into Latin.

 Food and Drink 
 Constantine I assigns convicts to grind Rome's flour, in a move to hold back the rising price of food in an empire whose population has shrunk as a result of plague (see  309 AD).

 Religion 
 The Christian Church is allowed to hold property.
 A synod held in Alexandria condemns Arianism.
 Jews in today's Germany are documented for the first time, in Colonia Agrippinensium (modern-day Cologne).

Births 
 Cheng of Jin (or Shigen), Chinese emperor (d. 342)
 Du Lingyang (or Chenggong), Chinese empress (d. 341)
 Valentinian I (the Great), Roman emperor (d. 375)

Deaths 
 Tuoba Yulü, Chinese prince of the Tuoba Dai
 Zu Ti (or Shizhi), Chinese general and adviser (b. 266)

References